CYS or Cys may refer to:

 Cysteine, an amino acid abbreviated Cys
 CYS, IATA and FAA LID airport code for Cheyenne Regional Airport, Wyoming, United States
 CYS, station code for Cathays railway station, Cardiff, Wales
 California Youth Symphony, a San Francisco Bay Area symphony orchestra for young musicians
 Cyprus Organization for Standardization, the Cyprus national standardization body
 Cys Kurland, footballer who played for the South African national side in 1947

See also
 Cys-la-Commune, a French commune